Cosas del Amor was a 1991 album by Vikki Carr that won a Grammy Award for Best Latin Pop Recording. The album produced the hit single, "Cosas del Amor", written by Rudy Perez & Roberto Livi, which reached No. 1 on the U.S. Latin charts for more than two months. The album also reached No. 1, where it stayed for one month. In the United States, this is her most successful Spanish-language disc.

Track listing 

 "Me Estoy Volviendo Loca"
 "Cosas del Amor" (duet with Ana Gabriel)
 "No Me Lo Nombren"
 "De Mujer a Mujer"
 "Ni Los Primeros Ni Los Ultimos"
 "Con Los Brazos Abiertos"
 "Olvidar Por Olvidar"
 "Atrapen al Ladron"
 "Esta Noche"
 "Palomo"

See also
List of number-one Billboard Latin Pop Albums from the 1990s

External links
Vikki Carr

1991 albums
Vikki Carr albums
Albums produced by Rudy Pérez
Spanish-language albums
Grammy Award for Best Latin Pop Album